Leithak Leikharol (lit. Of Heaven and netherworld), also spelt as the Leithak Leikhalol, is an ancient literary narrative work (puya), about the creation of the universe, genealogy of kings, moral teachings and mythology. It mentions some goddesses including Leimarel Sidabi, Nongthang Leima and Panthoibi. Goddess Leimarel Sidabi is said to be the omniscient. It states that goddess Panthoibi slays a demon.

Related pages 

 Korouhanba
 Samadon Ayangba

References 

Pages with unreviewed translations
Puyas